Graball may refer to:
Graball, Alabama 
Graball, Tennessee (disambiguation) (multiple locations)